Crikey steveirwini is a species of air-breathing land snail, a terrestrial pulmonate gastropod mollusc in the family Camaenidae. Crikey steveirwini is the only species in the genus Crikey.

Etymology
The specific name steveirwini is in memory of Australian wildlife expert Steve Irwin, who died from a stingray injury in 2006. The genus name was a favourite exclamation of Steve Irwin's, "crikey!" being an Australian minced oath. The snail species was described by John Stanisic, a scientist at the Queensland Museum who was later awarded Certified Environmental Practitioner of the Year 2010.

Habitat
Crikey steveirwini occurs in the north-eastern part of Queensland, Australia, in the tropical rain forests also known as the Wet Tropics. Crikey steveirwini is an arboreal species.

Appearance
The small, rare species has a high spire and is creamy yellow with coppery brown spiral bands. It can reach  in size.

See also
List of organisms named after famous people (born 1950–present)

References

Camaenidae
Gastropods described in 2009
Steve Irwin